Chris Haggard and Robbie Koenig were the defending champions.  Haggard did not participate this year.  Koenig partnered with Jim Thomas, losing in the first round.

Mike Bryan and Bob Bryan won in the final 6–4, 6–2, against Wayne Black and Kevin Ullyett.

Seeds

Draw

Draw

External links
Draw

2005 ATP Tour